Section 69 of the Constitution Act, 1867 is a provision of the Constitution of Canada creating the Legislature of the province of Ontario, which did not exist prior to 1867. The Constitution Act, 1867 created Ontario, including the institutions of the new provincial government, such as the Legislature.

The Constitution Act, 1867 is the constitutional statute which established Canada.  Originally named the British North America Act, 1867, the Act continues to be the foundational statute for the Constitution of Canada, although it has been amended many times since 1867.  It is now recognised as part of the supreme law of Canada.

Constitution Act, 1867

The Constitution Act, 1867 is part of the Constitution of Canada and thus part of the supreme law of Canada.  It was the product of extensive negotiations by the governments of the British North American provinces in the 1860s. The Act sets out the constitutional framework of Canada, including the structure of the federal government and the powers of the federal government and the provinces.  Originally enacted in 1867 by the British Parliament under the name the British North America Act, 1867, in 1982 the Act was brought under full Canadian control through the Patriation of the Constitution, and was renamed the Constitution Act, 1867.  Since Patriation the Act can only be amended in Canada, under the amending formula set out in the Constitution Act, 1982.

Text of section 69 

Section 69 reads:

Section 69 is found in Part V of the Constitution Act, 1867, dealing with provincial constitutions.  It has not been amended since the Act was enacted in 1867.

Purpose and interpretation
The province of Ontario did not exist prior to 1867.  From 1841 to Confederation in 1867, what are now the provinces of Ontario and Quebec formed the single Province of Canada.  Section 6 of the Act split the Province of Canada into the two new and separate provinces.  The Constitution Act, 1867 therefore had to create the government institutions for the two new provinces.

Section 69 of the Act created the Legislature of Ontario as a unicameral legislature, consisting of the elected Legislative Assembly and the appointed Lieutenant Governor of Ontario, the representative of the Crown. The Assembly originally had 82 seats, the same as the new federal House of Commons.  The Legislative Assembly also used the same electoral map as the House of Commons, set out in the First Schedule of the Act.

The unicameral legislature was the first in British North America.  Prime Minister John A. Macdonald explained that it was sufficient to have a unicameral legislature for what he considered to be a "subordinate Legislature", in the nature of a municipal body. However, the courts have held that the provincial legislatures do not act as delegates of the federal Parliament. Instead, the provinces exercise plenary legislative powers.   The purpose of the federation was not to subordinate the provinces to the federal government.  Rather, with respect to matters assigned to the provinces, "each province retain[s] its independence and autonomy."

The legislative powers of the Legislature are set out in section 92 of the Act and the subsequent sections dealing with specific legislative powers.

Related provisions
Section 6 of the Act split the Province of Canada into the two new provinces, Ontario and Quebec.

Section 70 of the Act provided that the Legislative Assembly would be composed of 82 members, using the electoral divisions set out in the First Schedule to the Act.  The Assembly currently is composed of 124 members, as set out in the Representation Act, 2015.

Section 81 of the Act provided that the Legislature was to be summoned no later than six months from the date the Constitution Act, 1867 came into force.

Section 82 of the Act provides that the Lieutenant Governor of Ontario has the power to summon the Legislative Assembly from time to time.

Section 83 of the Act prohibits individuals who hold provincial offices from sitting in the Legislative Assembly, other than the members of the Executive Council of Ontario.

Sections 92 to 95 of the Act sets out the legislative authority of the provincial legislatures.

References 

Constitution of Canada
Canadian Confederation
Federalism in Canada